Strawberry Mansion may refer to:

 Strawberry Mansion (album), a 2021 album by Langhorne Slim
 Strawberry Mansion (film), a 2021 film directed and written by Albert Birney and Kentucker Audley
 Strawberry Mansion, Philadelphia, a neighborhood in Philadelphia, Pennsylvania
 Strawberry Mansion Bridge, in Fairmount Park, Philadelphia, Pennsylvania
 Strawberry Mansion High School, in Philadelphia, Pennsylvania
 Historic Strawberry Mansion, an historic house in Philadelphia, Pennsylvania
 Nannie Lee House, an historic house in Melbourne, Florida, also known as the Strawberry Mansion